Saraina rubrofasciata is a species of spider in the family Salticidae found in West Africa (Ivory Coast, Cameroon and Nigeria).

References

Salticidae
Spiders of Africa
Spiders described in 1975